Cobham is an unincorporated community in Albemarle County, Virginia. It was named after Cobham, Surrey in England.

Cobham Park Estate was listed the National Register of Historic Places in 1974.

References

Unincorporated communities in Virginia
Unincorporated communities in Albemarle County, Virginia